Thomas Todd Manning and Blair Cramer Manning are fictional characters and a supercouple from the ABC daytime drama One Life to Live. In 2012, they also appeared together on General Hospital. Todd was originated by Roger Howarth and later portrayed by actor Trevor St. John. On August 17, 2011, St. John's character was revealed to be Todd's identical twin brother, Victor Lord Jr., conditioned to believe he was Todd and assume Todd's identity. Blair has been portrayed by Kassie DePaiva since the couple's inception.

The couple is often called "T&B" or "TnB" (for Todd and Blair) by fans on Internet message boards. Their popularity led to a nomination at the Daytime Emmy Awards, cited as one of television's top couples. An often tempestuous but loving relationship, the two have been titled "hands down the most brilliantly complex couple on daytime".

Writing
Todd and Blair's creation as a couple is described as factoring in several aspects of their own personalities, as well as their individual life experiences. In an interview, former One Life to Live head writer Michael Malone detailed the varying elements, what he set out to create, and how the couple eventually evolved:Todd and Blair were a great deal alike, two bad apples, two lost souls: conniving, deceitful, wounded and hiding the wounds for all they were worth behind a smart and sexy facade. Both were very much on guard against ever being susceptible to love. (A Scarlett and Rhett match-up, to use my perennial GWTW analogy that used to drive Josh Griffith crazy. I loved the movie, he didn't.) The idea for Todd/Blair came from wondering what would happen if two tricksters set out to trick each other, with no genuine thought of romance, and what if the ultimate trick was on them and they fell in love? In the beginning, Blair was trying to marry Todd for his money before he found out he was the heir to the Lord fortune, and Todd was trying to hurt any and everybody in town. Slowly they learned how much they had in common — both had rotten childhoods that left them with deep insecurities, both had rotten reputations in Llanview (and deserved them), both were willing to go to any lengths to get what they wanted — the safety of immense wealth, the thrill of somebody else's spouse, social acceptance by those who'd rejected them.
 
As soon as we put them together, the chemistry between Roger and Kassie was wonderful and we knew they would work as a couple. But deepest down, we planned to play that Blair was still in love with Max. That old flame was going to flare up and start fireworks as she and Todd started to fight over the ultimate prize of their daughter, Starr. Different producers, network folk, different writers took their story other places. — Michael Malone

In a 2001 interview, when asked if Todd and Blair are soulmates, actress Kassie DePaiva, portrayer of Blair, stated "Yes. Their connection is so deeply rooted. Less is more with them. They don't even need dialogue to speak. What they don't say speaks volumes."

In a 2008 interview, actor Trevor St. John, then-portrayer of Todd, spoke of Todd and Blair's on-again/off-again relationship. "It's a never-ending cycle," he said. "That's what people expect; they want Todd and Blair together, and the writers give them what they expect. It's not necessarily true that they'll do exactly what the fans want, but they do have an expectation, so the writers meet it." St. John did express discontent with the back and forth nature of the couple, however. He noted wanting something different. "Like I said", he stated, "there is an endless recycling of breaking up with Blair and getting back together, breaking up with Blair, then getting back together."

Storyline 
When Todd first appears on the show, in December 1992, he is an arrogant, cruel fraternity brother who leads his gang of "brothers" to participate in the brutal rape of Marty Saybrooke at a party in May 1993. After being sentenced to prison for eight years, Todd develops a burning desire to seek revenge on the two women he holds responsible for his jail time, Nora Gannon (his attorney who threw the case when she discovered that Todd was guilty) and Marty. After escaping from prison, Todd causes more terror when he holds a knife to Nora, who is blind at the time, and threatens to rape her. Nora is able to escape the attack when Bo Buchanan arrives in time to save her, and Todd flees. In time, Todd's run from the law soon ends on the night of the annual Costume Ball at a place called Serenity Springs. Bo is able to corner Todd and Todd has no other choice but to surrender. In a bizarre twist of fate, Todd is given a pardon after saving the lives of Marty and Tina and Cord's son, C.J. and Viki’s daughter Jessica Buchanan. But Todd's trouble is only beginning.

After becoming a free man once again, Todd faces his next obstacle: A string of rapes in Llanview become a thorn in his side, as all suspicions are pointing to him. After doing some detective work on his own, Todd is able to find out that the true culprit is his old fraternity brother, Powell Lord III. After a showdown with Powell, Todd finally has a sense of the pain he caused Marty and sincerely apologizes to her for the rape. The next shockwave to hit Todd is the sudden death of his father, Peter Manning. It is a bittersweet goodbye to the man who abused him as a child, but upon his death, Todd learns something even more startling. It is in his mother's old letters that he learns that he was adopted, and that there is also a large sum of money for him. Schemers David Vickers and Dorian Lord discover that Todd Manning is really an heir to none other than Victor Lord, and is worth an estimated $30 million.

In 1994, Todd's love life takes an unexpected turn as well, after he meets up with the very conniving Blair Daimler, who later learns of his "hidden" Lord fortune. Blair first meets Todd at Rodi's Bar. She goes there to lose her problems in a couple of drinks, which is exactly the same reason Todd is there. They bond almost immediately, become friends, and before long, they are making love. Their intimacy with each other is "no strings attached". It is after Blair discovers the truth about Todd being the Lord heir that she sets her plan into motion of marrying him. Blair tells Todd she is pregnant with his child, which starts out as a lie, but to the amazement of Blair, is actually true. They marry in 1995 and she becomes pregnant on their wedding night. It is not long after their wedding that Todd finds out that he is Victor Lord's son, and is now worth 27.8 million dollars. Trouble hits Todd again when he finds out that Blair knew all along about his inheritance. Todd files for divorce from Blair, who had already lost the baby she had been carrying. Todd is unaware that Blair has become pregnant a second time, and is keeping it a secret from him. Ironically, during the course of their marriage, Blair has fallen for Todd after all.

In fall 1995, Todd and Blair reconcile, and once again became man and wife, ready to start a real family with their unborn daughter. Unfortunately, their happiness is very short-lived, as tragedy is about to strike again. Wanting to set things right with the woman he raped, Todd takes a short trip to Ireland in order to track down Marty to tell her that the young girl she knows named Paloma is dying of AIDS. Todd helps Marty and her new friend, Patrick Thornhart, out of a jam. After being mistaken for Patrick, Todd is shot, stuffed into the trunk of a car, and driven off of a cliff.  Meanwhile, back in Llanview, Blair hears the terrible news that her husband is dead.  In her grief, Blair blames Marty, accusing her of wrapping Todd around her finger and playing on his guilt, even fearing that Todd had only loved her out of a vague resemblance to Marty. Blair struggles to carry her daughter, Starr, to term and manages to deliver her, becoming a single mother in the process. Her vengeance against Marty eventually sends her straight into the comforting arms of a jilted Patrick Thornhart. Little does Blair know that one of her nights of passion with Patrick is witnessed by none other than her "dead" husband Todd.

By mid-1996, Todd has "come back from the dead" and spies her in a clinch with Patrick. He is repulsed at her carrying Patrick's baby, and angrily engineers a kidnapping of Starr. The town rallies behind Todd and Blair over Starr's "disappearance", and Todd slowly softens towards Blair as she fears for their daughter. Starr is "rescued" with no one the wiser. A problem arises when it is discovered that Starr now needs a bone marrow transplant. Blair and Patrick's unborn baby is a match. A few weeks before delivery of the child, however, Patrick and Blair are slammed into head-on by another car (driven by Blair's cousin, Kelly Cramer, which sparks a rivalry that never truly fades away), killing Blair's unborn son "Brendan".  Blair lapses into a coma, while a scheming Alex Olanov steps in as the unlikely donor to save Starr's life. Blair wakes up long enough to cast Todd from her life, having discovered that he is behind Starr's kidnapping, then she has a severe stroke. While Blair recuperates, Todd refocuses his attentions, and sues for custody of Starr.

Todd marries his lawyer, Téa Delgado, in 1997 to help him win custody of Starr, which he does. Téa originally marries Todd because of the money he has paid her, but the two become much closer, and eventually Todd admits that he is in love with Téa and proposes true marriage. Like Todd and Blair, Todd and Téa fall in love and marry "for real". Todd hires Blair to work for him again and tries to prove Bo guilty for the murder of Georgie Phillips to get revenge on the Buchanans. When the evidence starts making Todd look guilty, he kidnaps everyone involved with Georgie and holds them all at the Buchanan lodge, determined to make the real murderer confess and thereby clear himself. Rachel Gannon finally confesses to Georgie's murder, and Todd runs off, taking Téa with him. In a rage, after Téa angrily taunts him for kidnapping her, he hits her. She later turns the tables on him when she knocks him out with a shovel, calls the police and has him arrested.

Todd escapes soon after, says goodbye to Starr, and corners Téa in a cabana. Sam Rappaport, Todd's former mentor and longtime father-figure, goes in to talk to Todd and learns that Todd was raped at age 14 by adoptive father Peter Manning. When Sam tries to introduce this fact in court, Todd collapses and goes into a catatonic state. When he awakes, he appears to have DID (split personalities), like his sister Viki. The personality called "Tom", a more childlike and gentle personality, is in control and is determined to have Téa give him a second chance. She eventually admits that she is still in love with him. After an apparent "integration" of Todd's newfound "alters", Todd and Téa soon marry again, but at the reception, Starr unknowingly plays a tape over the country club's loud speakers on which Todd confesses that he has been faking the DID to avoid criminal prosecution. Todd quickly leaves town in 1998 and Téa files for divorce.

Blair becomes romantically involved with her past lover, Max Holden. Some time later, Blair finds out that Max has been sleeping with Skye Chandler (later Quartermaine) and faking the brain damage everyone thinks he was recently saddled with. She tries to get revenge by destroying Max and Asa, using the dummy corporation "B&B United", which she forms with Ben Davidson. But Blair does not leave Max until Todd Manning shows back up in town, in 2000, determined to win Blair back. This, after he returned earlier in the year for Téa. Just as Blair starts to forgive Max for sleeping with Skye and they are reconciling, Todd makes sure that Max finds out about Blair's plot against him. Max throws Blair out, and she goes crazy, literally "seeing red" and shoots Max in the back. Todd helps Blair hide the evidence of the crime and pin the blame on Skye. Blair accepts Todd's marriage proposal and they make love. Todd rushes Blair's divorce through by bribing a judge and the couple plan to marry in the near future.

But this marriage is not to be. Max and Skye, bent on revenge, set them up, making it appear as though Blair has slept with Max the night before her wedding to Todd. They drug Blair, making sure that Todd sees them together. Todd does not let on to Blair what he thinks he saw until the wedding itself. His voiced laced with hostility, he announces to everyone that he cannot marry Blair because she is the one who shot Max in the back. Blair is stunned at Todd's betrayal and cannot understand why he is doing this. She later forces Max, at gunpoint to tell her what he has done. Blair goes to Todd to tell him the truth, but it is too late. Todd has already made a deal with the DA and has turned in the clothes Blair wore the night of the shooting, in return for a deal where he is spared jail time. Blair is arrested for shooting Max and is put in jail. In the hope that he will testify on her behalf to keep her and her baby out of jail, she lies when she tells Max that she is pregnant with his child. Blair is unaware, however, that she really is pregnant. She later discovers this when Max drags her to the hospital for a pregnancy test — except, she privately discovers that she is pregnant with Todd's child. Max agrees to testify on her behalf, but Starr locks him in Asa's wine cellar on the day of the hearing so that he never makes it there. Instead, Todd testifies that Blair was totally out of her mind the day that she shot Max. The judge sends Blair to St. Ann's instead of to jail and she sees her mother there. After talking with Addie, Blair realizes that Todd had actually been trying to help her by keeping her out of jail. Blair wonders if she should try again to tell Todd the truth.

Blair goes back to Max and they plan on marrying since Blair is carrying Max's baby. But Blair, knowing that the child is actually Todd's, wrestles with the truth. She flies down to Mexico to have the child, since she is afraid that Todd will take the baby away the same way he took Starr. But Todd follows her to Mexico. There, Todd delivers her baby, unaware that it is his. Todd thinks it is Max's and arranges for Blair's midwife, Paloma Sanchez, who also owns the hacienda, to "get rid" of the child. The child is given to David Vickers, who takes the baby and gives it to a rich couple in Texas.

This whole time, Blair thinks her baby is actually dead, since Todd tells her it is. Blair thinks that Todd will be upset when he finds out the baby "she  let die" was his, so she tells Starr not to tell him. Todd and Blair plan to marry again, but are both haunted by the secrets they are keeping from each other involving the baby. Finally, one of them cracks, before they can go through with the ceremony. Blair reveals to Todd that the baby that "died" was his. Todd is shocked and scrambles to get their child back. When they finally marry for the third time in December 2001, Todd presents the baby to her on their wedding night as a gift, telling her it was an "adopted" child. Blair almost finds out the truth several times, when David pops up, demanding more cash, and when Paloma comes to town, trying to tell Blair in broken English that the baby is alive after all.

All throughout 2002, the secrets surrounding Jack's birth and identity cause disaster to literally hang over Todd and Blair's marriage. Gabrielle Medina, whom Blair hates, finds out that the child is alive, and blackmails Todd into giving her a job. Blair thinks that Gabrielle is blackmailing him because Todd has gone through some "illegal procedures" in "adopting" their baby. But Todd's deception is discovered when baby Jack develops aplastic anemia, just like Starr had, and Todd has to bring Alex Olanov to town to, once again, be the bone marrow donor. Sam Rappaport, learning from Nora that Alex had been Starr's bone marrow donor too, puts everything together and tells Blair the truth, that Jack is her biological son and that Todd lied.

Blair is furious with Todd, and she hires bodyguards to keep him away from the baby. She and Sam secretly take the family away to Hawaii to get away from Todd. But the bodyguards are working for Todd and he follows them to Hawaii and plans to kidnap the kids. However, he runs into former love Téa Delgado there. Téa warns Blair about Todd's plans, and she is able to bring Starr and Jack safely back to Llanview. Once there, Blair decides to repay Sam for his help by getting his "true love", Nora, back for him by seducing Troy MacIver and making Nora break up with Troy.

Blair's plan fails and Troy and Nora find out what she had been trying to do. Sam is angry at first, but forgives her because she was only trying to help him. Sam and Blair grow closer during Todd's absence (they don't know that he is stranded on a deserted island with Téa) and Blair begins to depend on him more and more. He helps her through signing her divorce papers from Todd. When Todd returns to town, Blair is worried that he will try to steal her children again, and calls the police when she finds him alone with Jack. She struggles with her feelings for Todd.

Blair runs an exposé of a mob family in The Sun, which brings death threats against her. She does not take them very seriously until one day in the park her daughter's nanny, Suzanne, is shot and killed by a hitman who thinks she was Blair. The hitman comes face to face with Blair when she rushes to Suzanne's side, but the sound of approaching sirens causes him to flee. Blair is taken to a local police station, where Sam, Cassie Callison (who is in town to see Viki) and Todd go to see her. They come up with a plan to protect her. They will tell everyone she has lost her mind and was sent to a clinic in Switzerland. In reality, she will stay at Todd's penthouse where she can hide and still be with her children. Sam and Blair grow closer, but eventually she realizes that Todd is the only man she has ever really been in love with. She comes back to the penthouse and after they both admit they love each other, she forgives him for what he did to Jack and they make love. After Todd saves Blair from the hitman, who is arrested, Todd surprises Blair by calling Rev. Andrew Carptenter, summoned to come over and marry them right away. Sam is suspicious about Todd "saving" Blair and decides to investigate further into Suzanne's death. During the middle of Todd and Blair's marriage ceremony, Sam shows up at the penthouse with a very much alive Suzanne in tow and interrupts the wedding.

Blair moves back into the Cramer mansion and recoils from Todd's latest betrayal. She demands that he stay away from her and their children. Soon after, the reprehensible Mitch Laurence attempts to kidnap Starr in order to have a hold over Todd. Blair catches him in the middle of the act and begs him to take her instead. He does, chaining her up in an abandoned theater. Todd rescues her, but she is still ambivalent about their relationship. Before she can come to a decision, Todd mysteriously disappears. Meanwhile, her confidante and close friend Sam Rappaport is shot and killed while watching over a sleeping Blair. After initial speculation towards Todd, the blame shifts to Blair. Blair senses immediately that Mitch is involved. Frustrated beyond the breaking point, Blair knocks Mitch out, drags him to Llanfair and plans to shoot him as payback for all he has done to her and Todd, but a just-back-in-town Dorian stops her. Blair is cleared when she, Troy MacIver, and the cops realizes that Mitch must have manipulated an unstable Lindsay Rappaport into killing Sam, as she thought he was Troy. Lindsay confesses and is sent to St. Ann's. Dorian (whose only reason for marrying Mitch is to bring him down and get his money) and Blair works with her to kidnap and use Jessica Buchanan, Mitch's daughter with Viki, as bait for Mitch. Mitch fall off a cliff while attempting to get her back.

Blair breathes easy for a brief moment, and has Todd legally declared dead to free up his funds. She learns she will co-own the Sun with Viki and act as editor-in-chief until Starr is in her 20s. She also turns down Troy's romantic overtures. This all happened 2002 to mid-2003. Blair is jarred when a mysterious stranger shows up in town a little later claiming to be Mitch's brother. This man, Walker "Flynn" Laurence, is secretly working with Mitch, but sides with Blair when he learns of his brother's long list of crimes. Blair and Dorian take a shine to him, and Blair agrees to make him a reporter at The Sun. Blair finds herself the prime suspect in yet another murder when Mitch is killed days after his arrest. Blair, not realizing she is being manipulated by Walker, begins to suspect Dorian as the killer.

The killer is actually Jessica, and Walker is trying to protect her. With that resolved, Walker and Blair grow closer and closer. Blair is also being pursued by Kelly's husband, Kevin Buchanan. Not wanting to break up their marriage or give in to her lust for him, Blair flings herself into a relationship with Walker. Walker surprises her by rushing a wedding. She initially hesitates, but finally agrees. Todd is finally gone from her life, she feels, not realizing that Todd is actually standing right beside her.

After being brutally beaten and left near death by Mitch's goons, Todd convinced doctors to make him over to resemble Mitch's brother, Walker. As Mitch had not seen Walker in several years, Todd was able to fool him, along with all of Llanview. (In reality, Walker was a mobster who operated in Atlantic City, and the mastermind behind Todd's plastic surgery.) Kevin is the first to discover the secret, but keeps quiet for Blair's sake. When Blair realizes Todd's scheme, all hell breaks loose. She refuses to let him near their children and divorces him. Extremely drunk on New Year's Eve, 2003, Blair has a sleazy roll in the sheets with Kevin. Disgusted with herself, she prepares to leave the Palace Hotel. Todd spots her, realizes what her rumpled clothes mean, and follows her home, to her bedroom.

2004 opens with pure chaos when Blair accuses Todd of rape. She files charges, as well as custody papers. Throughout the trial, Todd goes easy on her, and Blair stays to her story, even as old nemesis Marty Saybrooke returns to town to testify and tell the court she feels that Todd is innocent. Soon after Todd's prison conviction, Blair passes out. She is suffering from a brain tumor. She realizes that she may have been wrong about what happened that night with Todd. As Todd gets a retrial (due to a juror's hearing aid not working), Blair ponders changing her story, not knowing of Todd's plan to tear her credibility to shreds during the new trial. With all the facts out in the open, Todd is exonerated. He still wants Blair back, but she is still unsure of their relationship. Blair is even more suspicious of Todd's new found closeness with Kelly, not knowing that Todd is helping her cover an illegal adoption of a baby to get back at Kevin. Starr is an emotional wreck over everything that has happened during the rape trial and her parents try to reassure her of things, though she still wants Todd and Blair back together.

After a fire at the community center, Blair finally sees that she is still in love with Todd, and the two again begin to plan their lives together. But Todd disappears on the eve of their wedding in December 2004, leaving Blair devastated. At first, she is furious with herself for falling for his lies again, but it is not long before she realizes he has been kidnapped by an insane Margaret Cochran, who is in love with and obsessed with Todd. Blair sets out to rescue Todd, but ends up being taken prisoner herself. She thinks she has been rescued when Asa Buchanan appears, but Asa is still angry about Todd and Blair trying to take his home from him a few months earlier. Asa has her committed to a mental institution, where Todd finds her as she is standing on a window ledge. He takes her back to Llanview, where a newly nervous Blair spends most of her time bonding with new next door neighbor, Ginger Foley, and trying to help Todd get over being raped by Margaret. But 2005 does not end well for the couple.

Blair meets the new doctor in town, Spencer Truman, when Jack needs to have an emergency tracheotomy performed. Blair and Spencer become fast friends, and their friendship helps her deal with Todd's arrest for the murders of Margaret Cochran and their unborn child, which Todd is convicted of and sentenced to prison for in early 2006. She and Todd eventually split over her growing belief that Todd committed the murders. This also strains her relationship with her daughter, Starr, who believes Todd is completely innocent. Spencer and Blair eventually become lovers, but Blair cannot let Todd out of her heart, and is heartbroken when he will not speak to her shortly before his execution. Blair watches as Todd is executed for the murders of Margaret Cochran and their infant son, and is shocked, as is everyone else, to learn that Margaret is alive and well. Blair feels horrible for believing, even for a moment, that Todd had been guilty. Seeing his lifeless body, she begs him to forgive her. With strained expertise, Todd is quickly brought back to life by Spencer, after Detective John McBain, Natalie Vega, and David Vickers bring a very much alive Margart Cochran into the room where the execution was held. Todd refuses to forgive Blair.

Blair, however, refuses to give up on Todd. Determined to prove her love and loyalty to him, she embarks on a Mata Hari-like plan to prove that Spencer is the one behind everything. Spencer is eventually jailed. But halfway through the trial, he fakes insanity, including intentionally repeatedly banging his head on a table in his cell and writing WHORE, referring to Blair, on a wall in the cell with his own blood. He goes as far to hire Marty Saybrooke, who is now a psychologist, to be his doctor; they have several sessions together, and she testifies in court that "in her professional opinion, Dr. Truman is not mentally stable, not fit to stand trial". By this time, Blair has yet to earn Todd's forgiveness, but she is keeping from him the fact that she has just discovered that she is a few months pregnant with his second son. As a result of Marty's testimony, Truman is sentenced to go to a mental facility instead of jail time. Furious over this, Todd kidnaps him on his way to Wingdale, and holds him captive while performing Chinese water torture on him, in a building for about a week to get Spencer to confess where his son (by Margaret) is. But 2006 goes just as it came — with all hell breaking loose. Blair gets in an accident when Truman lures her to the building and when she  arrives, she finds Todd and Truman fighting on the roof. She gets in the middle of them, as Todd pushes Spencer off the building, accidentally pushing Blair off as well. They hit the ground, three stories below. After her accident, which caused her to miscarry her and Todd's unborn child, Todd forgives her, and immediately plans on proposing to her yet again when she awakes from her coma. Todd proposes to Blair in early 2007, but she turns him down, saying that they are "toxic" to each other and that they just do not work. When Blair gets out of the hospital, she, Starr and Jack move to La Boulaie with Dorian. In a futile attempt to get over Todd, Blair has sex with Cristian Vega, who in turn is trying to get over Evangeline Williamson. It does not work for either, and although the two become good friends, Blair remains in love with Todd.

Acting on a tip from Spencer Truman's ex-patient Miles Laurence, Todd decides to travel to Chicago in the hopes of finding the infant son he had with Margaret Cochran. Blair follows him onto the plane, determined to help. Still heartbroken over their breakup and hurt by Blair's tryst with Cristian, Todd is angry, but still allows Blair to stay with him. The two began a search for the baby, but are soon separated. Todd is stabbed by a mysterious stranger and disappears. A desperate and scared Blair searched for him for months, but she turns up nothing. Eventually, it is revealed that Todd is being drugged and held by a young man named Hunter, who had been hired by Miles Laurence. Hunter's girlfriend turns out to be none other than Sarah Roberts, Todd's niece. Once a horrified Sarah realizes that her uncle is near death, she secretly calls Blair and reveals Todd's whereabouts. By the time Blair gets back to Chicago, Hunter has taken the unconscious Todd and dumped him back in Llanview on Miles' doorstep. In turn, Miles hauls Todd down to the storage room of his apartment building and continues to drug him. After several days, Miles' stepson Cole Thornhart (boyfriend to Todd and Blair's daughter, Starr, and son to Marty) accidentally stumbles upon Todd. Miles begins blackmailing a frightened Cole, telling him that if he tells anyone about Todd, then Cole's mother, Marty, will go to jail for killing Spencer Truman. Torn between his loyalty to his mother and his love for Starr, Cole remains silent, but eventually confesses what he knows to his mother and to the police. By this time, Miles has dumped a drugged Todd in the woods, and then instructs Hunter to drag him to a sleazy motel. It is here that Blair and John McBain finally find Todd boozed up, drugged, naked, and in bed with a prostitute named Kandi who claims she had been partying with him for weeks. A furious Blair does not buy Kandi's story, and rushes Todd to the emergency room.

The Manning family, complete with Blair, Todd, Starr, and Jack are reunited at the hospital while Todd recovers from his injuries. Todd remembers little of his 12-week ordeal, but once he learns that Miles is responsible for his plight, he vows revenge. Blair lets Todd know she wants to reconcile with him, and Todd softens towards her. Todd and Blair are upset over what happened before Chicago with Cristian and Evangeline, and know they have a lot to work out. Luckily, for the first time in a long, they seem to be on the same page.

Todd and Blair later become closer and nearly kiss. Unfortunately, in court, though Miles is charged with attempted murder for what he did to Todd, the judge throws out the case. Todd and Blair are furious, but can do little about it. They go to the Women of the Year Ceremony together, where things get chaotic as usual, and Lindsay Rappaport (who wins the award) is revealed to be Spencer's murderer. Todd and Blair make sure to cover this revelation in the Sun. After the ceremony, they celebrate their hot front-page story, but the mood is ruined when Miles shows up with information regarding where Todd's son is. Todd, sure that his son is dead, becomes angry and does not believe him, which leads to Todd beating Miles up. Miles, realizing that he has to get the truth to Todd some way, goes to Blair and tells her the truth and gives her proof. It is all there in writing — Tommy Mcbain is Todd's son.

When Marcie McBain is at large with his son, on December 20, 2007, Todd announces that "Tommy" will be renamed "Sam Manning," in honor of his deceased mentor and friend, Sam Rappaport. It is not long afterward that his son is returned to him. Marcie is on the run with Todd's son for almost four months and Blair helps him deal with it. They reconnect during this time, and after a while, Blair comes clean and tells Todd she still loves him.

Todd and Blair bring Sam home, everyone deals with adjustment issues, including Blair, who wonders if she will be able to raise Sam as her own son. Blair even starts having visions of Margaret, which she eventually tells Todd about. Todd is concerned and they talk about their issues, leading to Todd telling Blair that he loves her and wants a real marriage with her. The two make love and are reconciled once more. But in 2008, Starr becomes pregnant by Cole after the "move" Todd was going to have for protection. After Starr and Cole run away, they are found by John, Blair, and then later by Todd. Todd punches Cole and accidentally pushes Starr down the stairs. After Blair finds out that Starr is pregnant, Blair cuts Todd out of their lives for making Starr's life miserable.

Téa Delgado returns to Llanview, PA in late 2008 and begins a relationship with Todd shortly thereafter in 2009. Upon discovering Todd and Téa's growing closeness, Blair launches a plan to win Todd back from Téa. After a good effort and intricate plotting on her part, including having sex with Todd in Dorian's cabana, conspiring to defraud Téa and blackmail, Todd chooses Téa to Blair's chagrin. After being kidnapped by Ross Rayburn (the unintended result of her latest scheme to break up Todd and Téa) alongside Todd and Téa's daughter, Danielle, Blair concedes defeat.

When a man appears in town in summer 2011 who has Todd's old face, it is revealed that the man who has been posing as Todd for the last eight years is not really Todd but rather his long-lost twin brother, Victor Lord Jr. Irene had twin boys but brainwashed Victor to take over Todd's life to aid her secret agency with many mission throughout the world. With the revelation that her long-lost love has returned, Blair and Todd may find themselves drawn to each other again, while Téa is currently married to Victor. Todd blamed Blair for not knowing that Victor wasn't him and for letting him near their children and that he fought to get back to her.

Todd moves to Port Charles, where Starr resides. Blair stays in Llanview with Tomás Delgado, but decides to come to Port Charles to support Starr when Starr has a singing debut. After the debut, Todd and Blair go back to his hotel room, where they exchange a kiss and he proposes marriage to her, but she says no because she is engaged to Tomás. Blair then heads back to Llanview. A few months later, Todd, Carly, and Skye find out Tomás could be Alcazar.

Impact 

Todd and Blair are often recognized as one of television's most prominent pairings. The two were nominated for "Most Irresistible Combination" at the 32nd Daytime Emmy Awards, and in 2001, were nominated for About.com's couple of the year title. In 2002, Todd and Blair were named the top One Life to Live all-time romantic couple by magazine Soaps In Depth. They are also one of the most avidly watched supercouples.

Before the writers secured Todd and Blair as a supercouple, the pairing was often in direct competition with rival couple Todd and Téa, an alternate romantic pairing for Todd. This created an intense rivalry between the two fanbases, which became known as the "T&B vs. TnT" wars, and were some of the genre's most notorious Internet battles. They left writers and producers with the task of deciding which couple would be the "true love" couple. In addition, viewers enjoyed the battles between Blair and Téa, which became one of soap opera's most entertaining rivalries.

While Todd is the town rapist (having raped Marty Saybrooke in college), Blair herself is the product of rape (as her mentally ill mother was raped and impregnated by an unnamed hospital attendant).

Todd and Blair were the original founders of "The Most Pathetic Club" in which they competed for the title of "Most Pathetic." They had their first real meeting at Rodi's Bar in 1994; Blair was drinking at the bar when Todd came up and asked if the seat next to her was taken. The writers also scripted Todd and Blair as best friends before the two ever became involved romantically.

See also
List of supercouples
Todd Manning and Marty Saybrooke rape storylines
Lord family
Cramer family

References

External links
SoapCentral

One Life to Live characters
General Hospital characters
Soap opera supercouples